Abu Yusuf Mohammad Khalilur Rahman is a Bangladesh Nationalist Party politician and a former member of parliament for Joypurhat-2.

Career
Rahman was elected to parliament from Joypurhat-2 as a Bangladesh Nationalist Party candidate in 1991, 1996, 1996, and 2001. He was an executive committee member of Bangladesh Nationalist Party but was expelled for his support of reforming the party during the 2007-08 caretaker government term. He was readmitted to Bangladesh Nationalist Party in 2018.

References

Bangladesh Nationalist Party politicians
Living people
5th Jatiya Sangsad members
6th Jatiya Sangsad members
7th Jatiya Sangsad members
8th Jatiya Sangsad members
Year of birth missing (living people)